The Netherlands has submitted films for the Academy Award for Best International Feature Film since 1959. The award is handed out annually by the United States Academy of Motion Picture Arts and Sciences to a feature-length motion picture produced outside the United States that contains primarily non-English dialogue. The award was created for the 1956 Academy Awards, succeeding the non-competitive Honorary Academy Awards which were presented between 1947 and 1955 to the best foreign language films released in the United States.

, seven Dutch films have been nominated for Academy Award for Best Foreign Language Film, three of which have won the award: The Assault in 1987, Antonia's Line in 1996 and Character in 1998. Two Dutch submissions were disqualified: The Vanishing in 1989 because more than half of the film was spoken in French and Bluebird in 2006 because it had aired on television.

Fons Rademakers represented the Netherlands in the competition five times, achieving two Oscar nominations, including one win.

Submissions
The Academy of Motion Picture Arts and Sciences has invited the film industries of various countries to submit their best film for the Academy Award for Best Foreign Language Film since 1956. The Foreign Language Film Award Committee oversees the process and reviews all the submitted films. Following this, they vote via secret ballot to determine the five nominees for the award. Before the award was created, the Board of Governors of the Academy voted on a film every year that was considered the best foreign language film released in the United States, and there were no submissions. Below is a list of the films that have been submitted by the Netherlands for review by the Academy for the award since its first entry in 1959.

See also
List of Academy Award winners and nominees for Best Foreign Language Film
List of Academy Award-winning foreign language films
Cinema of the Netherlands
Golden Calf for Best Feature Film

Notes

A: The Vanishing was disqualified because the Academy determined that there was too much French dialogue in the film to meet the requirements. Although the film was produced in the Netherlands by French-Dutch filmmaker and a mostly Dutch cast, AMPAS deemed that the film was unsuitable to represent the Netherlands. The Dutch declined to send another film, leaving them unrepresented for the first time since 1972.
B: Bluebird was rejected by the Academy because the film previously aired on Dutch television. The Academy was not persuaded by the fact that the film had been newly edited for cinema since the broadcasting, stating "there was not enough difference between the two versions." Because of the late notification the Netherlands was unable to submit a new entry.
C: The Dutch selection committee originally announced The Silent Army, by Jean van de Velde as their official Oscar submission. Several people within the Dutch film industry protested that the film was not eligible since it contained too much English dialogue and because it had screened in Dutch theatres in an alternate version, in violation of AMPAS rules. The committee withdrew the submission and agreed to reconvene. They then chose The Silent Army a second time. After conferring with AMPAS and being told that the film was, in fact, going to be disqualified, they met a third time and selected Winter in Wartime.

Notes

References

External links
The Official Academy Awards Database
The Motion Picture Credits Database
IMDb Academy Awards Page

Dutch
Lists of Dutch films